Infanta Pilar of Spain, Duchess of Badajoz and Viscountess of La Torre (Spanish: María del Pilar Alfonsa Juana Victoria Luisa Ignacia y Todos los Santos de Borbón y Borbón; 30 July 1936 – 8 January 2020), sometimes known more simply as Pilar de Borbón, was the elder daughter of Infante Juan, Count of Barcelona and Princess María Mercedes of the Two Sicilies, and older sister of King Juan Carlos I.

Early life
Infanta Pilar was the firstborn daughter of Juan de Borbón y Battenberg and María de las Mercedes de Borbón y Orleans, Counts of Barcelona, she was born in Ville Saint Blaise, home of the counts of Barcelona in Cannes (Alpes-Maritimes, France), on 30 July 1936. She was baptized in Cannes, in the church of Rins, with the name of María del Pilar Alfonsa Juana Victoria Luisa Ignacia de Todos los Santos de Borbón y Borbón. Her godparents were her paternal grandfather, King Alfonso XIII and her maternal grandmother the Princess Louise of Orléans, although Alfonso XIII acted by delegation as he did not want to meet his wife Queen Victoria Eugenia. From her birth, as the daughter of the heir to the Crown of Spain she was given the title of Infanta of Spain with treatment of Royal Highness. However, the official recognition of that title came when her brother was already King of Spain.

When she was an infant, the family moved to Rome where the Spanish Royal Family settled in exile. In 1941, after the resignation of Alfonso XIII, her father became the holder of the dynastic rights of the Spanish Crown in exile. During World War II she lived at Lausanne in Switzerland, where her grandmother, Queen Victoria Eugenia, lived. In 1946 the family resettled at Estoril in Portugal.

Her family attempted to marry her to Baudouin of Belgium, who ended up marrying Fabiola de Mora instead.

At the wedding of her brother  Juan Carlos I of Spain with Princess Sofía of Greece, in 1962, she was one of eight bridesmaids.

Marriage and family

Pilar needed to renounce her rights of succession to the Spanish throne to marry a commoner as stipulated by the Pragmatic Sanction of Charles III on marriages of members of the royal family.

She married Don Luis Gómez-Acebo y Duque de Estrada, 2nd Viscount of La Torre (23 December 1934 – 9 March 1991) on 5 May 1967 in Lisbon, Portugal at Jerónimos Monastery, who obtained with his marriage the status of Grandee of Spain. They had five children:

Doña María de Fátima Simoneta Luisa Gómez-Acebo y Borbón (31 October 1968)
Don Juan Filiberto Nicolás Gómez-Acebo y Borbón, later 3rd Viscount of La Torre (6 December 1969)
Don Bruno Alejandro Gómez-Acebo y Borbón (15 June 1971)
Don Luis Beltrán Ataúlfo Alfonso Gómez-Acebo y Borbón (20 May 1973)
Don Fernando Humberto Gómez-Acebo y Borbón (13 September 1974)

Her husband died of lymphatic cancer on 9 March 1991.

Equestrian sport
Pilar de Borbón had been supporting international equestrian sport. She was President of the International Equestrian Federation from 1994 to 2006, succeeded by HRH Princess Haya bint al Hussein. She wrote the foreword of the official Spanish translation of the national instruction handbook of the German National Equestrian Federation, Técnicas Avanzadas de Equitación - Manual Oficial de Instrucción de la Federación Ecuestre Alemana.

From 1996 to 2006 she was a member of the International Olympic Committee for Spain, when she became an honorary member, and Member of the Executive Board of the Spanish Olympic Committee.

Philanthropic and other activities
Pilar de Borbón was one of the founders of Asociación Nuevo Futuro ("New Future Association") in 1968, an international child support organization, and was its president and then president of honor. Until her death, she was one of the leaders and supporters of the Rastrillo Nuevo Futuro event, which provided part of the income that financed Asociación. The event even received the visit of the Queens of Spain, Letzia and Sofia. Rastrillo has always been a place of meeting, solidarity and enjoyment for her, wrote ¡Hola! magazine in January 2019. Her last public appearance was in "Rastrillo" on 23 November 2019.

Pilar de Borbón was also a member of the board of directors of the Queen Sofía Spanish Institute in New York City, president of the World Monuments Fund España and, from 2007 to 2009, president of Europa Nostra, the European Federation for the Defense of Cultural Heritage.
She was also a music fan and accompanied her brother, King Juan Carlos of Spain, and nephews to bullfighting matches.

Financial holdings

Mossack Fonseca files document that in August 1974, Pilar de Borbón became president and director of the Panama-registered company Delantera Financiera SA (registered May 1969) with her husband as secretary-treasurer and director. In 1993, London-based Timothy Lloyd who had represented the undisclosed owner of the company said that Pilar de Borbón owned it. After March 1993, the intermediary representing the company was Madrid-based  Abogados, a law firm founded by Pilar de Borbón's brother-in-law . From July 2006 until its dissolution in June 2014, five days before the installation of her nephew Felipe VI, Pilar de Borbón's son Bruno Alejandro Gómez-Acebo Borbón was director and treasurer of the company. On 7 April 2016 she admitted the accusations concerning the company were valid but made it clear that she never personally evaded taxes.

Illness and death
Pilar was operated for an intestinal obstruction on 2 February 2019 in Madrid, and was diagnosed with colon cancer in 2019, being made public in May of the same year. On 5 January 2020, she was admitted to the hospital as her condition worsened. She died 3 days later on 8 January 2020 at the Ruber International Hospital in Madrid, with her family at her side.

She was cremated on 9 January 2020 and her ashes were buried alongside her husband in Saint Isidore Cemetery, Madrid, in a private ceremony. On 28 January 2020, a funeral was held in her honor in El Escorial basilica, with the presence of her nephew, King Felipe VI of Spain, of former Queen of the Netherlands, Princess Beatrix, her brother Juan Carlos I and Sofía of Spain, the Duke of Braganza Duarte Pio and with Spanish political authorities represented by Deputy Prime Minister Carmen Calvo, Mayor of Madrid José Luis Martínez-Almeida and President of the Congress of Deputies Meritxell Batet.

Honours

National
 : Knight Grand Cross of the Order of Charles III
 : Dame Grand Cross of the Order of Queen Maria Luisa
 : Knight Grand Cross of the Royal Order of Sports Merit

Foreign
  Greek Royal Family: Dame Grand Cross of the Order of Saints Olga and Sophia
  Two Sicilian Royal Family (Hispano-Neapolitan branch): Dame Grand Cross of Justice of the Sacred Military Constantinian Order of Saint George

 : Grand Cross of the Order of Infante Henry

Ancestors

References

External links

1936 births
2020 deaths
Deaths from cancer in Spain
Deaths from colorectal cancer
Dukes of Spain
Grandees of Spain
House of Bourbon (Spain)
International Olympic Committee members
People from Cannes
People named in the Panama Papers
Spanish infantas